Alexander Stewart (1477 – 19 December 1537) was a Scottish prelate; also known as Alexander Stewart of Pitcairn. He was the son of Alexander Stewart, Duke of Albany, and his first wife Catherine Sinclair, daughter of William Sinclair, Earl of Orkney and Earl of Caithness. The marriage of his parents was dissolved in 1478 and his father remarried, but it was not until 1516 that an act of parliament made the marriage unlawful and ensured that Alexander Jr. would be regarded as legally illegitimate and unable to inherit his father's title.

His high birth, however, enabled a successful career in the church. He held Inchaffray Abbey from 1514, and Scone Abbey from 1518 in commendam. Between 1516 and 1518 he held a right to the commend of Whithorn Priory, a right he gave up to the papally-backed Silvio Passarini. He held the Collegiate Church of Dunbar from 1504 until at least 1510, and almost certainly beyond. He was Dean of Brechin from at least 1523, and perhaps as early as 1512. He was given crown nomination to the bishopric of Moray and then papal provision on 13 September 1529, after the failure of the candidature of Alexander Douglas I. He was probably not consecrated until 1532. He was allowed to retain control of his monastic commends. He died on 21 December 1537.

References

 Watt, D.E.R., Fasti Ecclesiae Scotinanae Medii Aevi ad annum 1638, 2nd Draft, (St Andrews, 1969)
 Watt, D.E.R. & Shead, N.F. (eds.), The Heads of Religious Houses in Scotland from the 12th to the 16th Centuries, The Scottish Records Society, New Series, Volume 24, (Edinburgh, 2001)

16th-century Scottish Roman Catholic bishops
Bishops of Moray
Scottish abbots
Scottish priors
Scottish princes
Alexander
16th-century Scottish people
1477 births
1537 deaths